Košarkaški klub Pirot, commonly referred to as KK Pirot, is a men's professional basketball club based in Pirot, Serbia. They are currently competing in the Second League of Serbia.

History 
In the 2019–20 season, Pirot placed third in the Second League of Serbia and got promoted to the Basketball League of Serbia for the 2020–21 season.

Players

Coaches 

  Zoran Sotirović (2000–2001)
  Oliver Kostić (2001–2002)
  Zoran Sotirović (2002–2004)
  Zoran Sotirović (2008–2009)
  Marko Spasić (2011–2012)
  Zoran Petrović (2012–2014)
  Mihajlo Mitić (2014–2016)
  Marko Spasić (2016–2020)
  Filip Socek (2020–2021)
  Zoran Milovanović (2021–present)

Trophies and awards

Trophies
 First Regional League – East Division (3rd-tier)
 Winners (1): 2012–13

Individual awards 
 Second Men's League of Serbia assists leader (4):
 Sanel Mukanović — 2013–14, 2014–15, 2017–18, 2018–19

Notable players 
  Svetislav Pešić
  Zoran Lazarević
  Strahinja Dragićević
  Nemanja Nenadić
  Venky Jois

References

External links

 Profile at srbijasport.net 
 Profile at eurobasket.com

Pirot
Pirot
Basketball teams established in 1952
1952 establishments in Serbia
Pirot